Thomas Lehn (born 1958 in Fröndenberg) is a German piano and synthesizer player active in free improvisation and contemporary music.

Lehn has recorded with Marcus Schmickler, Keith Rowe, John Butcher, Phil Minton, Phil Durrant, Radu Malfatti, Axel Dörner, Cor Fuhler, Gerry Hemingway, and Andy Moor of The Ex. He is a member of the electronic orchestra M.I.M.E.O.

In 1997 Lehn formed a free improvisation band Konk Pack. They have released three CDs.

Discography
Thermal (with John Butcher /Andy Moor) (2001, CD, Unsounds)

Konk Pack
 Big Deep (1999)
 Warp Out (2001) 
 Off Leash (2005)

External links

 
 A Profile
 Konk Pack

1958 births
Living people
People from Fröndenberg
Free improvisation
Electroacoustic improvisation
German experimental musicians
Hochschule für Musik und Tanz Köln alumni